Gamasellus tasmanicus is a species of mite in the family Ologamasidae.

References

tasmanicus
Articles created by Qbugbot
Animals described in 1956